Particles is a 2019 French-Swiss co-produced drama film directed by Blaise Harrison. It was screened in the Directors' Fortnight section at the 2019 Cannes Film Festival and was nominated for the camera d'Or. The film won the Golden Peacock (Best Film) at the 50th International Film Festival of India.

Cast
 Thomas Daloz as P.A.
 Néa Lueders as Roshine
 Salvatore Ferro as Mérou
 Léo Couilfort as Cole
 Nicolas Marcant as JB

References

External links
 

2019 films
2019 drama films
2010s coming-of-age drama films
2010s French-language films
French coming-of-age drama films
2010s French films